This list of botanical gardens and arboretums in Oregon is intended to include all significant botanical gardens and arboretums in the U.S. state of Oregon.

See also
List of botanical gardens and arboretums in the United States

References 

 
 
Tourist attractions in Oregon
botanical gardens and arboretums in Oregon